The 1973 Philippine martial law referendum was a national referendum in which the citizens' assemblies voted for:
The ratification of the 1973 Constitution
The suspension of the convening of the Interim National Assembly provided in the transitory provisions of the 1973 Constitution
The continuation of Martial Law
The referendum was set from July 27 to July 28, 1973.

This referendum was marred with controversy. It is contested that there could not have been any valid referendum held from January 10 to January 15, 1973. Observers noted that many of the claimed 35,000 citizens' assemblies never met and voting was by show of hands.

Results

Summary

By province/city

See also
Commission on Elections
Politics of the Philippines
Philippine elections

References

External links
 Official Philippine Commission on Elections website 

Martial law under Ferdinand Marcos
1973 in the Philippines
1973 referendums
Military reform referendums
Political repression in the Philippines
Presidency of Ferdinand Marcos